June Rochelle is an American contemporary gospel singer, songwriter, executive media producer, editor, and talent scout from Indianapolis, Indiana. Her music infuses gospel, soul, pop, r&b, and jazz. Her debut album, Changing Places, garnered a Grammy ballot. Her next albums are Play This, and June Rochelle Christmas ' Rochelle is the first African-American to headline ABC's-RTV6 Circle of Lights. She was previously a backing vocalist for Diana Ross and Celine Dion. June Rochelle is also the founder of Good Deeds People a public-benefit charity and June Rochelle Media.

References

External links

Living people
Year of birth missing (living people)
American soul singers